Damon Gus Tassos (December 5, 1923 – February 28, 2001) was a guard in the National Football League. He was drafted in the third round of the 1945 NFL Draft by The Yanks and played with the Detroit Lions that season. After another season with the Lions he went on to play three more with the Green Bay Packers.

References

1923 births
2001 deaths
American football guards
Texas A&M Aggies football players
Detroit Lions players
Green Bay Packers players
Players of American football from San Antonio